The 2014–15 Japan Figure Skating Championships took place on December 26–28, 2014 at the Big Hat in Nagano. It was the 83rd edition of the event. Medals were awarded in the disciplines of men's singles, ladies' singles, pair skating, and ice dancing.

Results

Men

Ladies

Pairs

Ice dancing

Japan Junior Figure Skating Championships
The 2014–15 Junior Championships took place on November 22–24, 2014 at the Niigata Asahi Alex Ice Arena in Niigata (city). Medals were awarded in men's singles, ladies' singles, and ice dancing. There was no junior pairs event during the Junior Championship. Junior pairs event was held during the senior competition on December 26–28, 2014.

Men

Ladies

Pairs

Ice dancing

International team selections

World Championships
The World Championship team was announced as follows:

  Takahito Mura replaced Tatsuki Machida due to Machida's retirement.

Four Continents Championships
The Four Continents Championship team was announced as follows:

World Junior Championships
The World Junior Championship team was announced as follows:

References

External links
 2014–15 Japan Figure Skating Championships results

Japan Figure Skating Championships
Japan Championships
Figure Skating Championships